The Man From Tomorrow is a Canadian science fiction adventure television series which aired on CBC Television in 1958.

Premise
The lead character, Melpar, has travelled back in time to meet a pair of boys in the 1950s. Their adventures include a trip to Mars.

Scheduling
The 15-minute episodes were broadcast Mondays at 5:00 p.m. (Eastern time) from 7 July to 6 October 1958.

References

External links
 

CBC Television original programming
1958 Canadian television series debuts
1958 Canadian television series endings
Black-and-white Canadian television shows
Canadian science fiction television series
Television shows filmed in Vancouver